Collège des Dix-Huit (College of the Eighteen), founded in 1180 AD, was the earliest college of the University of Paris in France.

History
The college was founded in 1180 AD by an Englishman by the name of Josse to endow 18 scholars near to Notre Dame de Paris. It was based just south of the Rue des Poirées.

In Warriors of the Cloisters. The Central Origins of Science in the Medieval World (2012) Christopher Beckwith argued that this earliest European college was modeled on the Central Asian madrasa:

The founding text of the college:

The college was disestablished during the reconstruction of the University in the 17th century.

References 

 La fondation du collège des Dix-Huit (1180) / Classes BnF

 
1180 establishments in Europe
1180s establishments in France
12th-century establishments in France
Paris, University of